Matthias Hager (born 14 November 1997) is an Austrian footballer who currently plays as a centre-back for SC Wolkersdorf.

References

External links
 
 
 Matthias Hager at ÖFB

1997 births
Living people
Austrian footballers
Floridsdorfer AC players
SV Schwechat players
SKN St. Pölten players
Association football defenders